Pseudocoremia fascialata, also known as the Horopito flash, is a species of moth in the family Geometridae. It is endemic to New Zealand.

References 

Boarmiini
Moths of New Zealand
Endemic fauna of New Zealand
Moths described in 1903
Taxa named by Alfred Philpott
Endemic moths of New Zealand